Anastasia Gozhva or Hozhva (born 5 December 2001) is a Ukrainian figure skater. She is the 2019 Jégvirág Cup champion and 2016 Ukrainian national champion. She competed in the final segment at the 2016 World Junior Championships.

Personal life 
Gozhva was born on 5 December 2001 in Kyiv. Her sister, Daria (one year older), is also a competitive figure skater.

Career

Early career 
Gozhva began learning to skate in 2004. In the 2015–16 season, she won both the junior and senior Ukrainian national titles. Too young to compete in senior internationals, she was sent to the 2016 World Junior Championships in Debrecen, Hungary. She qualified for the free skate by placing 13th in the short program and finished 17th overall.

In February 2017, Gozhva won the silver medal at the 2017 European Youth Olympic Winter Festival in Erzurum, Turkey. She made her senior international debut in September at the 2017 CS Ondrej Nepela Trophy.

2018–2019 season 
Gozhva placed fourth at the 2019 Ukrainian Championships. Because none of the medalists met the minimum age or TES requirements, she was named in Ukraine's team to the 2019 European Championships in Minsk, Belarus. Ranked 36th in the short program, she did not advance to the free skate. In February, she outscored Nicole Schott by 1.16 points to win gold at the Jégvirág Cup in Hungary.

Programs

Competitive highlights 
CS: Challenger Series; JGP: Junior Grand Prix

References

External links 
 

2001 births
Ukrainian female single skaters
Living people
Sportspeople from Kyiv
Competitors at the 2023 Winter World University Games